The 2009 Ordina Open is a tennis tournament played on outdoor grass courts. It is the 20th edition of the Ordina Open, and is part of the International Series of the 2009 ATP Tour, and of the WTA International tournaments of the 2009 WTA Tour. Both the men's and the women's events take place at the Autotron park in Rosmalen, 's-Hertogenbosch, Netherlands, from 14 June through 20 June 2009. Benjamin Becker and Tamarine Tanasugarn won the singles titles.

ATP entrants

Seeds

 Seedings are based on the rankings of June 8, 2009.

Other entrants
The following players received wildcards into the main draw:
  Daniel Berta
  Jesse Huta Galung
  Raemon Sluiter

The following players received entry from the qualifying draw:
  Benjamin Becker
  Kristof Vliegen
  Dick Norman
  Thiemo de Bakker

WTA entrants

Seeds

 Seedings are based on the rankings of June 8, 2009.

Other entrants
The following players received wildcards into the main draw:
  Daniela Hantuchová
  Tamarine Tanasugarn
  Michaëlla Krajicek
  Yanina Wickmayer

The following players received entry from the qualifying draw:
  Kirsten Flipkens
  Maria Elena Camerin
  Ksenia Pervak
  Yaroslava Shvedova
 
The following players got entry through the Lucky loser spot:
  Séverine Brémond 
  Stéphanie Foretz

Champions

Men's singles

 Benjamin Becker  defeated  Raemon Sluiter, 7–5, 6–3
It was Becker's first career title.

Women's singles

 Tamarine Tanasugarn  defeated   Yanina Wickmayer,  6–3, 7–5
 It was Tamarine Tanasugarn's 1st title of the year, and her 3rd overall.

Men's doubles

 Wesley Moodie /  Dick Norman defeated  Johan Brunström /  Jean-Julien Rojer, 7–6(7–3), 6–7(8–10), [10–5]

Women's doubles

 Sara Errani /  Flavia Pennetta  defeated   Michaëlla Krajicek /  Yanina Wickmayer 6–4, 5–7, [13–11]

External links
 

Ordina Open
Ordina Open
Ordina Open
Rosmalen Grass Court Championships